Matthew Kurzejewski (born June 27, 1991) is an American professional stock car racing driver. He most recently competed full-time in the ARCA Menards Series, driving the No. 52 Toyota/Chevrolet for Ken Schrader Racing in 2016. Prior to that, he competed with his own team for the entirety of his stock car racing career. This includes in ARCA part-time for four seasons (2008 and 2013, 2014, and 2015, the year he won the series' superspeedway championship. He also made two Truck Series starts in 2013 at Iowa and Las Vegas and ran part-time in the East Series in 2009. However, he is currently and has been without a ride in any series since 2016.

Racing career
After getting many good finishes driving part-time for his own team for a few years, he signed with the No. 52 team for Ken Schrader Racing to run his first full season in ARCA in 2016. Also, they picked up sponsorship from Menards (as well as Ansell), which moved over to KSR after sponsoring Frank Kimmel since 2009. They replaced Federated Auto Parts as the team's full season sponsor. That year marked the first time the No. 52 car ran with one driver for the full season for the first time in over three years. Even though he did not win any races, Kurzejewski earned a third-place finish in points.

Motorsports career results

NASCAR
(key) (Bold – Pole position awarded by qualifying time. Italics – Pole position earned by points standings or practice time. * – Most laps led.)

Camping World Truck Series

Camping World East Series

ARCA Racing Series
(key) (Bold – Pole position awarded by qualifying time. Italics – Pole position earned by points standings or practice time. * – Most laps led.)

References

External links
  Broken link
 

1991 births
NASCAR drivers
ARCA Menards Series drivers
Living people
People from Mansfield, Pennsylvania
Racing drivers from Pennsylvania